Telling Everybody is the debut album by Australian boy band and pop vocal group Human Nature released on 2 December 1996 by Columbia Records owned by Sony Music Entertainment Australia.

Track listing 
"Tellin' Everybody" (Andrew Tierney, Paul Begaud, Michael Tierney)– 4:01
"Got it Goin' On" (Tierney, Paul Begaud, Tierney) – 3:50
"Whisper Your Name" (Tierney, Paul Begaud, Tierney) – 4:19
"Wishes" (Andrew Klippel, Glass) – 4:04
"Something in the Way" (Klippel, Glass, Benedict, Tierney, Tierney) – 3:41
"Party (Feels So Fine)" (Tierney, Paul Begaud, Tierney) – 4:52
"Don't Say Goodbye" (Tierney, Paul Begaud, Tierney) – 4:22
"Can I Do You" (Klippel, Tierney, Phil Burton, Tierney, Toby Allen) – 4:58
"Sleepin' Alone" (Tierney, Kee, Tierney) – 3:57
"September Girl" (Tierney, Tierney) – 3:53
"Love Unconditional" (Klippel, Benedict, Lawrie) – 3:51
"People Get Ready" (Curtis Mayfield) – 3:18

Bonus CD tracks 
 "Wishes (AK's Comfort Zone Mix)" - 4:54 	
 "Last Christmas (A Capella)" - 3:09 	
 "Tellin' Everybody (On the Floor)" - 6:08 	
 "Wishes (A Capella)" - 3:48 
 "Got It Goin' On (Nuff Club Mix)" - 7:21

Charts

Weekly charts

Year-end chart

Certifications

Credits 
 Vocal arrangements by Human Nature (tracks: 1 to 10, 12), Phil Burton (tracks: 1 to 10, 12)   
 Design – Kevin Wilkins    
 Engineer – Carmen Rizzo (tracks: 1, 2, 7, 10), Louie Shelton (tracks: 4, 5, 8, 11), James Cadsky (track 3), David Hemming (track 12)
 Guitar – Paul Begaud (tracks: 1, 2, 6, 10), Louie Shelton (tracks: 8, 9), Chris Bruce (track 5)
 Mastered by Carmen Rizzo, Chris Bellman 
 Scratches – DJ A.S.K.  (track 9)
 Mixed by Carmen Rizzo (tracks: 1 to 5, 8, 10, 11), Mick Guzauski (track 7), David Hemming (track 12)
 Photography – Vicki Ballard  
 Producer – Andrew Klippel (tracks: 4, 5, 8, 11), Paul Begaud (tracks: 1 to 3, 6, 7, 9, 10)  
 Programmed by Andrew Klippel (tracks: 4, 5, 8, 11), Paul Begaud (tracks: 1 to 3, 6, 7, 9, 10)

References

Human Nature (band) albums
Columbia Records albums
1996 albums
1996 debut albums